The small town of El Fresno  is located in the northwest of Jiquilpan, Mexican State of Michoacán de Ocampo and southwest of Sahuayo, De Morelos, Michoacán.

The small town has over 207 inhabitants and is over 1960 meters above sea level.

The town is noticeable because of the milk and cheese.  It also has a Pemex gas station and some abarrotes, or small stores. It has a connection between Road #110 to La Piedad and Manzanillo, Colima End Road. In the town overlooking the meadow vegetation with mesquite, cactus and yucca huisache, the mixed forest of pine, oak and cedar, also shrubs of different species.
Features and Land Use
lesser extent livestock and forestry.
It is also known for crops and fields with corn and chickpeas.

El Fresno also has a soccer field, and a large "presa" where people fish.

Nearby cities and towns
Abadiano
 Guadalajara
 Jiquilpan
 Sahuayo
 San José de Gracia
 Manzanillo (Via #110 Route)
 Valle de Juárez
 Cerro San Francisco
 La Jara
 Los Remedios
 Llano Prieto
 La Lagunita
 Paredones
 Paso
 Timbiscato
 La Cantera
 Totolán
 Guadalupe
 El Molino
 San Onofre
 Jaripo
 Las Mesas
 Las Ánimas
 Cuesta
 Brete
 ^Jiquilpan de Juárez
 Santa María
 San Antonio Guaracha
 Los Animas
 San Juanico
 Santa Bárbara
 Maríano Escobedo
 Capadero
 Villamar
 Lagunilla
 La Huerta
 La Yerbabuena
 Casa Fuerte

Nearby airports
 Zamora (ZMM), Zamora, Mexico (63.2 km)
 Lic. Miguel de la Madrid Airport (CLQ), Colima, Mexico
 Lic. y Gen. Ignacio Lopez Rayon National Airport (UPN), Uruapan, Mexico (131.7 km)
 Don Miguel Hidalgo y Costilla International Airport (GDL), Guadalajara, Mexico (138.2 km)

Climate

Cultural foods
 Birria
 Tamales
 Chile relleno
 Tacos

Festivals

March / April: Easter
March 16-25: Fiestas Patronales de San Jose/ Funsion
March 18: Commemoration of the petroleum expropriation
April 13: Anniversary of elevation to city status (1891)
May 21: Birthday of General Lázaro Cárdenas
7 August: Feast of San Cayetano
October 4: Feast in honor of St. Francis of Assisi
Oct. 19: Commemoration of the death of General Lázaro Cárdenas
November 20: Anniversary of the Mexican Revolution
December 1–12: Fiesta of Nuestra Virgen Guadalupana, (Our Lady of Guadalupe)

External links
 Panoramio (Don't Remove!)
 MySpace (Don't Remove!)

Tour
 Tourist info

Schools
There are only two schools in the town.
- Colegio Lazaro Cardenas (Telesecundaria Comunitaria El Fresno)
- Pre-Escolar

See also

Municipalities of Michoacán
Jiquilpan is also the birthplace of Lazaro Cardenas, president of Mexico.
Jiquilpan is the only city with two presidents of the republic. It is the birthplace of Damian Alcazar, actor and movie director, who was in "El crimen del padre Amaro", and "La ley de Herodes", and some Hollywood Movies.

References

Populated places in Michoacán